Statistics of Meistaradeildin in the 1964 season.

Overview
It was contested by 3 teams, and Havnar Bóltfelag won the championship.

League table

Results

References
RSSSF

Meistaradeildin seasons
Faroe
Faroe

pl:Meistaradeildin (1963)